Frederic Costa is a Nigerien professional football manager.

Career
Until December 2008 he coached the Niger U17 team. Since December 2008 until 2009 he worked as manager of the Niger national football team.

References

External links

Year of birth missing (living people)
Living people
Nigerien football managers
Niger national football team managers
Place of birth missing (living people)